Culver Brook (also known as Culver Creek) is the West Branch of the Paulins Kill and flows through Frankford Township and Branchville Borough in Sussex County in northwestern New Jersey.  Its headwaters are fed by Bear Swamp, Lake Owassa, and Culver's Lake and merges with the Dry Brook before joining the Paulins Kill's east branch near the unincorporated hamlet of Augusta in Frankford Township.

See also
List of rivers of New Jersey

Rivers of Sussex County, New Jersey
Paulins Kill watershed
Rivers of New Jersey